Eugenia reinwardtiana (Chamorro: a'abang) is a shrub to small tree in the family Myrtaceae, (Native to tropical forests in northern Queensland, Australia;  Indonesia, and the Pacific Islands). Also known as the Cedar Bay cherry. Other common names include Beach Cherry, Australian Beach, Mountain Stopper, and Nioi (Hawaii). They are typically  in height.

The tree is particularly common around the Cedar Bay National Park in northern Australia and the edible fruit was especially popular with the hippies who lived there in the 1970s.

The fruits are green at first, when ripe it turns to a bright orange-red colour, these fruits are also taste sweet and delicious with its soft flesh.

Uses
The tree is cultivated to a limited extent for its edible sweetish fruit that is often eaten out-of-hand, used to flavour drinks and candies, or as a preserve. The fruit is a source of antioxidants.

The tree is well-suited to amenity horticulture in the tropics, and is grown in the median strips in Cairns. It is readily propagated from fresh seed.

This species is susceptible to Myrtle Rust (Puccinia psidii).

References

External links

reinwardtiana
Plants described in 1828
Bushfood
Flora of Malesia
Flora of New Guinea
Flora of Oceania
Flora of the Mariana Islands
Flora of Queensland
Flora of the Pacific
Edible fruits